Labeobarbus ensifer is a species of ray-finned fish in the  family Cyprinidae. It is endemic to the Cuanza River basin in Angola.

References

Endemic fauna of Angola
ensifer
Taxa named by George Albert Boulenger
Fish described in 1910